Jeffrey Frank is an American journalist and author from Washington, D.C., born in Baltimore. He is a senior editor at The New Yorker and deputy editor of the Outlook Section in the Washington Post.

Frank worked for the Post for almost 12 years. He published his first novel at the age of 22. Along with his wife, he won the 2014 Hans Christian Andersen prize for a new translation of Andersen's works.

Frank has written four novels: The Creep, The Columnist, Bad Publicity: A Novel, and Trudy Hopedale: A Novel. He is the author of Ike and Dick: Portrait of a Strange Political Marriage. He worked at The Washington Post and The Washington Star.

References

External links

newyorker.com Articles by Jeffrey Frank (in The New Yorker)
authors.simonandschuster.com Author profile at Simon & Schuster

21st-century American novelists
American male journalists
American male novelists
The New Yorker editors
Living people
Writers from Baltimore
21st-century American male writers
Novelists from Maryland
21st-century American non-fiction writers
Year of birth missing (living people)